Faraklata is a village and a community in the municipal unit of Argostoli, Cephalonia, Greece. It is situated on a mountain slope above the eastern shore of the Gulf of Argostoli, at about 220 m elevation. Faraklata is 2 km south of Dilinata, 4 km northeast of Argostoli and 7 km northwest of Valsamata. The community consists of the villages Faraklata (population 330 in 2011), Razata (pop. 507), Drapano (pop. 135) and Prokopata (pop. 86). There is a small cave east of the village. Faraklata suffered great damage from the 1953 Ionian earthquake.

Historical population

References

External links
GTP Travel Pages

Populated places in Cephalonia